Jhivvan Jameel Jackson Meléndez (born August 27, 1998) is a Puerto Rican-Panamanian professional basketball player for Spirou Charleroi of the BNXT League. He played college basketball for the UTSA Roadrunners.

Early life and high school
Jackson began playing basketball at the age of five. He moved from his hometown of Bayamón, Puerto Rico to Dallas, Texas in seventh grade. He played four years of varsity basketball at Trinity High School in Euless, Texas. As a freshman, Jackson was teammates with top recruit and future National Basketball Association (NBA) player Myles Turner. In his senior season, he averaged 22 points, five rebounds, five assists and 2.8 steals per game. and also his olde brother Jalen Jackson He scored 52 points in a 92–91 overtime win over Denton Guyer High School in the playoffs after missing the two games previous with an injured ankle. Jackson was lightly recruited, his only NCAA Division I offers coming from New Mexico and UTSA, and was not rated by any major recruiting services. On October 16, 2016, he committed to play for UTSA, who discovered him at an all-star game in New York City.

College career
As a freshman, Jackson was named Conference USA freshman of the year and Second Team All-Conference USA. He averaged 18.4 points per game to lead the team. Jackson tore his ACL at the end of his freshman season, cutting the year six games short. He missed the first three games of his sophomore season while recovering from the injury. He scored a career-high 46 points and hit a career-high eight three-pointers in a 96–88 overtime loss to Western Kentucky on January 31, 2019. As a sophomore, Jackson led Conference USA in scoring with 22.9 points per game on 38.6 percent shooting from the field, combining with Keaton Wallace to form the highest scoring backcourt in Division I. Jackson was named to the First Team All-Conference USA.  On December 21, Jackson scored 41 points in a 89–70 win over Illinois State. He was subsequently named National Player of the Week by the United States Basketball Writers Association (USBWA), becoming the first Conference USA player to win the award since its creation in 2009–10. On February 6, 2020, Jackson scored a season-high 45 points in an 85–81 overtime victory over Old Dominion. Jackson scored 14 points in a 84–59 loss to Old Dominion on March 4 and surpassed the 2,000 point mark. At the conclusion of the regular season, Jackson was named to the First Team All-Conference USA. As a junior, Jackson averaged 26.8 points, 5.6 rebounds, and 2.4 assists per game. He averaged 19.9 points, 4.2 rebounds, and 3.4 assists per game as a senior.

Professional career
On March 6, 2022, Jackson signed his first professional contract with CB Menorca of the LEB Plata.

On August 29, 2022, he has signed with Spirou of the BNXT League.

National team career
Jackson was named to the Puerto Rico U18 team in the 2016 FIBA Americas Under-18 Championship. He averaged 12.4 points and 3.6 rebounds per game in five games.

Career statistics

College

|-
| style="text-align:left;"| 2017–18
| style="text-align:left;"| UTSA
| 29 || 9 || 25.7 || .431 || .368 || .768 || 3.2 || 1.8 || 1.0 || .1 || 18.4
|-
| style="text-align:left;"| 2018–19
| style="text-align:left;"| UTSA
| 29 || 24 || 30.8 || .386 || .351 || .846 || 4.1 || 2.4 || 1.2 || .1 || 22.9
|-
| style="text-align:left;"| 2019–20
| style="text-align:left;"| UTSA
| 32 || 31 || 34.5 || .418 || .354 || .852 || 5.6 || 2.4 || 1.4 || .2 || 26.8
|-
| style="text-align:left;"| 2020–21
| style="text-align:left;"| UTSA
| 25 || 24 || 33.2 || .468 || .369 || .784 || 4.2 || 3.4 || 1.0 || .3 || 19.9
|- class="sortbottom"
| style="text-align:center;" colspan="2"| Career
| 115 || 88 || 31.1 || .421 || .359 || .818 || 4.3 || 2.5 || 1.2 || .2 || 22.2

Personal life
Jackson's father, LeRoy Jackson, played college basketball in the early 1990s for Oregon State before playing for Panama and professionally in Puerto Rico and the Dominican Republic. His grandfather, Flor Meléndez, played for Puerto Rico at the 1968 Olympics and professionally in Puerto Rico. Meléndez coached the national teams of Puerto Rico, Argentina and Panama as well as professional teams in Venezuela and Spain.

Jackson's name, Jhivvan, is derived from the Hindi word, "Jeevan," meaning life.

References

External links
UTSA Roadrunners bio

1998 births
Living people
Basketball players from Dallas
Point guards
Puerto Rican men's basketball players
Spirou Charleroi players
Sportspeople from Bayamón, Puerto Rico
UTSA Roadrunners men's basketball players